HD 125612 is a binary star system with three exoplanetary companions in the equatorial constellation of Virgo. It is too dim to be visible to the naked eye, having an apparent visual magnitude of 8.31. The system is located at a distance of 188 light years from the Sun based on parallax measurements, but it is drifting closer with a radial velocity of −18 km/s.

The yellow-hued primary component, designated HD 125612 A, is an ordinary G-type main-sequence star with a stellar classification of G3V, which indicates it is generating energy through hydrogen fusion at its core. It is about 1.4 billion years old and is rich in heavy elements, having a 70% greater abundance of iron compared to the Sun. The star has 109% of the mass and 105% of the girth of the Sun. It is radiating 109% of the luminosity of the Sun from its photosphere at an effective temperature of 5,900 K.

A red dwarf companion star, HD 125612 B, was detected in 2009 at a projected separation of 4750 AU. The possibility of a much closer companion to the primary star was also suggested, though this will need more observation to better define.

Planetary system

There are three known exoplanets in orbit around HD 125612 A. The first was reported in 2007 and designated HD 125612 b, but it did not fully resolve the stellar velocity variations and it was clear there were other companions. Two additional companions, HD 125612 c and d, were reported in 2009. In 2022, the inclination and true mass of the outer planet HD 125612 d were measured via astrometry.

See also
 HD 170469
 HD 231701
 HD 17156
 HD 11506
 List of extrasolar planets

References

G-type main-sequence stars
M-type main-sequence stars
Planetary systems with three confirmed planets

Virgo (constellation)
Durchmusterung objects
125612
070123
Binary stars